The Four Tours World Championship was an annual professional golf tournament that was played from 1985 to 1991. It was played between teams representing the four main professional tours: the American PGA Tour, the PGA European Tour, the PGA Tour of Australasia and the Japan Golf Tour. In 1985 and 1986 it was called the Nissan Cup, in 1987 and 1988 it was called the Kirin Cup while from 1989 to 1991 it was called the Asahi Glass Four Tours World Championship.

Each team played the other three teams in the group stage. The leading two teams then played a final, with the other two teams playing for third and fourth places. There were six players on each team. Each match consisted of six singles matches, decided by medal match play over 18 holes.

Winners

Team

Two points were awarded for a win, one point for a halved match. In 1989 United States won the championship with an aggregate score of 404 to Europe's 416. In 1990 the final was cancelled because of rain. Both teams had scored 20 points in the three group matches which meant that the result was decided on aggregate scores. Wayne Levi did not complete his first match because of an injury and hence the United States score was uncountable and Australasia were declared the winners.

Individual Trophy

Summary

1985
Sandy Lyle won the individual event with a score of 267 for his four rounds, three ahead of Curtis Strange

Source:

Teams
The teams were:
United States: Raymond Floyd (captain), Mark O'Meara, Corey Pavin, Calvin Peete, Curtis Strange, Lanny Wadkins
Europe: Bernhard Langer (captain), Gordon Brand Jnr, Howard Clark, Sandy Lyle, Sam Torrance, Ian Woosnam
Japan: Isao Aoki, Kikuo Arai, Shinsaku Maeda, Tsuneyuki Nakajima, Naomichi Ozaki, Tateo Ozaki
Australasia: Ian Baker-Finch, Wayne Grady, David Graham, Brian Jones, Graham Marsh, Greg Norman

Seve Ballesteros was on the original European team but withdrew and was replaced by Ian Woosnam

1986
Tsuneyuki Nakajima won the individual event with a score of 270 for his four rounds, two ahead of Bernhard Langer.

Source:

Teams
The teams were:
United States: John Mahaffey, Calvin Peete, Dan Pohl, Payne Stewart, Hal Sutton, Bob Tway
Europe: Bernhard Langer (captain), Gordon J. Brand, Howard Clark, Nick Faldo, Sandy Lyle, Ian Woosnam
Japan: Tsuneyuki Nakajima, Masashi Ozaki, Naomichi Ozaki, Tateo Ozaki, Koichi Suzuki, Nobumitsu Yuhara
Australasia: Ian Baker-Finch, Rodger Davis, David Graham, Brian Jones, Graham Marsh, Greg Norman

1987

Teams
The teams were:
United States: Mark Calcavecchia, Tom Kite, Dan Pohl, Scott Simpson, Payne Stewart, Curtis Strange, Lanny Wadkins
Europe: Bernhard Langer (captain), Ken Brown, Nick Faldo, Sandy Lyle, José María Olazábal, Ian Woosnam
Japan: Isao Aoki, Hajime Meshiai, Tsuneyuki Nakajima, Tōru Nakamura, Masashi Ozaki, Tateo Ozaki
Australasia: Ian Baker-Finch, Rodger Davis, Brian Jones, Graham Marsh, Greg Norman, Peter Senior

1988

Teams
The teams were:
United States: Chip Beck, Ben Crenshaw, Steve Pate, Mike Reid, Joey Sindelar, Curtis Strange
Europe: Gordon Brand Jnr, Anders Forsbrand, Mark James, Mark Mouland, Ronan Rafferty, José Rivero
Japan: Isao Aoki, Hiroshi Makino, Masahiro Kuramoto, Tsuneyuki Nakajima, Yoshimi Niizeki, Nobuo Serizawa
Australasia: Ian Baker-Finch, Rodger Davis, Brian Jones, Graham Marsh, Craig Parry, Peter Senior

1989

Teams
The teams were:
United States: Chip Beck, Mark Calcavecchia, Ken Green, Tom Kite, Payne Stewart, Curtis Strange
Europe: Bernhard Langer (captain), Gordon Brand Jnr, Mark James, José María Olazábal, Ronan Rafferty, Ian Woosnam
Japan: Tōru Nakamura, Masashi Ozaki, Naomichi Ozaki, Tateo Ozaki, Koichi Suzuki, Katsunari Takahashi
Australasia: Ian Baker-Finch, Wayne Grady, Brian Jones, Greg Norman, Craig Parry, Peter Senior

1990

Teams
The teams were:
United States: Mark Calcavecchia, Fred Couples, Wayne Levi, Jodie Mudd, Tim Simpson, Payne Stewart
Europe: Nick Faldo (captain), David Feherty, Mark James, Bernhard Langer, Ronan Rafferty, Ian Woosnam
Japan: Saburo Fujiki, Hideki Kase, Masahiro Kuramoto, Naomichi Ozaki, Nobuo Serizawa, Noboru Sugai
Australasia: Ian Baker-Finch, Rodger Davis, Wayne Grady, Brian Jones, Craig Parry, Peter Senior

1991

Teams
The teams were:
United States: Fred Couples, Jim Gallagher Jr., Billy Mayfair, Tom Purtzer, Bob Tway, Lanny Wadkins
Europe: Sam Torrance (captain), Paul Broadhurst, David Feherty, Colin Montgomerie, Ronan Rafferty, Steven Richardson
Japan: Yoshinori Kaneko, Hideki Kase, Ryoken Kawagishi, Hiroshi Makino, Noboru Sugai, Tsukasa Watanabe
Australasia: Ian Baker-Finch, Rodger Davis, Mike Harwood, Roger Mackay, Graham Marsh, Craig Parry

References

Team golf tournaments